Membrane metallo-endopeptidase-like 1 is a protein that in humans is encoded by the MMEL1 gene.

Function 

The protein encoded by this gene is a member of the neutral endopeptidase (NEP) or membrane metallo-endopeptidase (MME) family. Family members play important roles in pain perception, arterial pressure regulation, phosphate metabolism and homeostasis. This protein is a type II transmembrane protein and is thought to be expressed as a secreted protein. This gene is expressed mainly in testis with weak expression in the brain, kidney, and heart.

References

Further reading